The 2009 LPGA of Japan Tour was the 42nd season of the LPGA of Japan Tour, the professional golf tour for women operated by the Ladies Professional Golfers' Association of Japan. It consisted of 35 golf tournaments, all played in Japan. Shinobu Moromizato and Sakura Yokomine each won six events and Yokomine won the Order of Merit title.

Tournament results

Events in bold are majors.

The Mizuno Classic was co-sanctioned with LPGA Tour.

See also
2009 in golf

External links
 

LPGA of Japan Tour
LPGA of Japan Tour
LPGA of Japan Tour